Steven Wayne Daniels (born December 12, 1992) is a former American football linebacker who is currently the inside linebackers coach at Bryant University. He played college football at Boston College, and was drafted by the Washington Redskins in the seventh round of the 2016 NFL Draft.

Daniels graduated from St. Xavier High School in Cincinnati in 2011, then completed a postgraduate year at Worcester Academy before attending Boston College. As a senior at Boston College he earned first-team All-Atlantic Coast Conference honors from ACC coaches.

Professional career

Washington Redskins
Daniels was selected by the Washington Redskins in the seventh round (232nd overall) of the 2016 NFL Draft. Daniels suffered a torn labrum during the team's training camp in August 2016, requiring surgery and prematurely ending his rookie season. On May 2, 2017, Daniels was waived by the team.

Philadelphia Eagles
On May 3, 2017, Daniels was claimed off waivers by the Philadelphia Eagles. He was waived by the Eagles on June 1, 2017, but re-signed with them on a three-year contract on July 26. He was waived again on August 12, 2017.

New York Giants
On August 15, 2017, Daniels was signed by the New York Giants. He was waived on September 1, 2017.

Coaching career
Daniels joined the Bryant University's football staff in the summer of 2019. He joined the staff serving as a positions coach, specifically for the inside linebackers coach after working as an intern with the football program at Boston College, followed by serving as a performance and assistant strength coach at Northeastern.

References

External links

Bryant Bulldogs bio
Boston College bio

1992 births
Living people
African-American players of American football
Players of American football from Cincinnati
American football linebackers
Worcester Academy alumni
Boston College Eagles football players
Washington Redskins players
Philadelphia Eagles players
New York Giants players
21st-century African-American sportspeople
Bryant Bulldogs football coaches